The Central Indo-Pacific is a biogeographic region of Earth's seas, comprising the tropical waters of the western Pacific Ocean, the eastern Indian Ocean, and the connecting seas.

The Central Indo-Pacific is a part of the larger Indo-Pacific, which includes the tropical Indian Ocean, the western and central tropical Pacific Ocean, and the seas connecting the two in the general area of Indonesia. The Central Indo-Pacific may be classified as a marine realm, one of the great biogeographic divisions of the world's ocean basins, or as a subrealm of the Indo-Pacific.

The Central Indo-Pacific realm covers eastern shores of the tropical Indian Ocean, including most of the Indian Ocean coast of the Indonesian archipelago, the northern Australian coast, and the Cocos and Christmas islands. It extends through the tropical seas connecting the Pacific and Indian oceans, including the Java Sea in central Indonesia, the South China Sea between the Asian mainland and the Philippine and Malay archipelagos, and the Arafura Sea separating Australia and New Guinea. It includes the seas surrounding island groups of the western Pacific, including the Ryukyu Islands, Caroline Islands, Marianas Islands, New Guinea and the Bismarck Archipelago, Solomon Islands, Vanuatu, New Caledonia, Fiji, Tonga, and Lord Howe Island.

It is bounded on the west by the Western Indo-Pacific, with the transition at the Strait of Malacca and in southern Sumatra. The Central Indo-Pacific includes the seas surrounding the northern half of Australia, while the Temperate Australasia marine realm includes the seas surrounding the southern half of Australia. The boundaries between those two marine realms lie in Western Australia and southern Queensland. The Eastern Indo-Pacific lies to the east, extending across most of tropical Polynesia. To the north, the Taiwan Strait forms the boundary with the Temperate Northern Pacific, which also includes the larger Japanese islands.

The Central Indo-Pacific includes the Coral Triangle region, which has the greatest diversity of tropical coral reef species in the world. The Coral Triangle has 605 tropical coral species, including 15 endemic species, about 76% of the world's total (798 species). The Coral Triangle has 2,228 species of reef fishes, of which 235 (7.8%) are endemic, about 37% of the world total (6000 species). It includes the largest and second-largest coral formations in the world, Australia's Great Barrier Reef and the New Caledonia Barrier Reef.

Subdivisions
The Central Indo-Pacific is further subdivided into marine provinces, and the marine provinces divided into marine ecoregions:

South China Sea
 Gulf of Tonkin
 Southern China
 South China Sea Oceanic Islands

Sunda Shelf
 Gulf of Thailand
 Southern Vietnam
 Sunda Shelf/Java Sea
 Malacca Strait

Java Transitional
 Southern Java
 Cocos-Keeling/Christmas Island

South Kuroshio
 South Kuroshio

Tropical Northwestern Pacific
 Ogasawara Islands
 Mariana Islands
 East Caroline Islands
 West Caroline Islands

Western Coral Triangle
 Palawan/North Borneo
 Eastern Philippines
 Sulawesi Sea/Makassar Strait
 Halmahera
 Papua
 Banda Sea
 Lesser Sunda
 Northeast Sulawesi

Eastern Coral Triangle
 Bismarck Sea
 Solomon Archipelago
 Solomon Sea
 Southeast Papua New Guinea

Sahul Shelf
 Gulf of Papua
 Arafura Sea
 Arnhem Coast to Gulf of Carpentaria
 Bonaparte Coast

Northeast Australian Shelf
 Torres Strait and Northern Great Barrier Reef
 Central and Southern Great Barrier Reef

Northwest Australian Shelf
 Exmouth to Broome
 Ningaloo

Tropical Southwestern Pacific
 Tonga Islands
 Fiji Islands
 Vanuatu
 New Caledonia
 Coral Sea

Lord Howe and Norfolk Islands
 Lord Howe and Norfolk Islands

References

 
Marine realms
Oceans
Indian Ocean
Pacific Ocean